The Mystical Adventures of Billy Owens is a 2008 Canadian fantasy film, which takes place in Spirit River, Alberta, Canada, about a boy who discovers on his 11th birthday that he is capable of using magic and must save his town from destruction. This film was presented in two parts under a "To Be Continued" format, with a sequel, Billy Owens and the Secret of the Runes, which followed in 2010.

Plot
Narrated by Mandy (Ciara O'Hanlon), as she tells the story of her friend Billy Owens, (Dalton Mugridge) an average boy who has just turned 11. She notes the strangeness of him being born at the stroke of 11 on November 11, which is later discovered to be a number of great power. Billy, along with know-it-all Mandy and their cowardly but loyal best friend Devon (Christopher Fazio) discover that Billy's family has magical origins, and upon a chance encounter with a mysterious shop keeper (Roddy Piper) who Billy buys a wand from for $11, they also find out that he can use the wand to cast magic spells, and together they embark on a journey to save their town of Spirit River from a foretold prophecy and prevent the resurrection of a dragon under the influence of the ancient Viking trickster God Loki.

Cast
 Dalton Mugridge - Billy Owens
 Ciara O'Hanlon - Mandy Finch
 Christopher Fazio - Devon Turner
 Jennifer Pearson - Katherine Owens
 Jenny Elliott - Principal Gwendolyn Cups
 Jordan Goulet - Kurt Nemees
 Roddy Piper - William Thurgood
 Paul Germs - Victor Mould
 Bob Mugridge - William Owens

Critical reception
The film was panned by several critics. DVD Verdict said about the movie "Nothing about this film is the least bit coherent. Nothing. Zero. Zip. Nada. Zilch," and went on to compare the movie's plot line to that of the Harry Potter franchise. Common Sense Media gave it one out of five stars, saying "At the end of the day, this is a poorly filmed, poorly executed attempt to get on board the Harry Potter train". The film was panned by both critics for both its poor quality and rushed nature.

References

External links
 
 

2008 films
Canadian fantasy films
English-language Canadian films
2008 fantasy films
2000s English-language films
2000s Canadian films